Capital Area Transit (CAT), also known as the Cumberland-Dauphin-Harrisburg Transit Authority, is a regional public transportation agency that operates bus and paratransit service in the Harrisburg–Carlisle metropolitan statistical area. Its scheduled route bus service covers much of the southern half of Dauphin County and the eastern half of Cumberland County. It also operates two bus routes into northern York County. CAT's shared ride/paratransit operations serve residents throughout Dauphin County.

CAT employs approximately 200 people and its management headquarters and bus maintenance facility are both located at 901 North Cameron Street in Harrisburg.

History 
The Cumberland-Dauphin-Harrisburg Transit Authority was formed in 1973 after the dissolution of the Harrisburg Railways Company. When that company ceased operations, the city of Harrisburg and Cumberland and Dauphin counties formed the authority to ensure mass transit services would continue to be available in the Harrisburg–Carlisle metropolitan statistical area. Pennsylvania’s Municipal Authorities Act of 1945 permitted the city and counties to undertake the action to create CAT.

The Athority is governed by a seven member Board of Directors. Three are appointed by the city of Harrisburg, two are selected by Dauphin County, and two are chosen by Cumberland County. Each board member serves a five year term (at which time they may be reappointed by their respective municipalities). The Board meets each month on the last Wednesday to set policy and provide guidance to the staff. Committees of the Board meet on an ad-hoc basis dependent upon the activity occurring within the Authority.

CAT currently has two divisions – a Fixed Route Bus Division and a Shared Ride/Paratransit Division.  A third division for commuter rail is currently being developed.

On December 22, 2020, it was announced that CAT and rabbittransit would merge to form the Susquehanna Regional Transportation Authority. The merger was proposed in order for better service and to prevent CAT service cuts. The merged system will use the rabbittransit name. The CAT branding continues to be used on buses, with a sticker underneath the CAT logo saying  "a service of rabbittransit."

Bus fleet 
CAT owns a fleet of 87 fixed route buses. The fleet includes eleven 35 foot buses, twenty-one 29 foot buses, and fifty-five 40 foot low floor buses.  CAT's buses followed a three digit numbering scheme until 1994.  Buses bought in 1995 are numbered to show their year of acquisition (95) in the first two digits.  Starting in 2001, all CAT buses ordered that year or later show the year in the second digit of the bus number.  CAT's active fleet roster is shown below.

Transportation network 
, CAT operates 32 bus routes in its fixed route network.  These include short distance shuttle routes, longer distance, rush hour express routes, and regular, intermediate length routes.  Nearly all the routes  are organized into a hub and spoke system centered on Downtown Harrisburg.  The hub in the system is the CAT Transfer Center, located at the southeast corner of the intersection of 2nd Street and Market Street in Harrisburg's Market Square.

CAT routes have either a number or letter and route name assigned to distinguish individual routes. Generally speaking, numbered routes operate in the Harrisburg "East Shore" area in Dauphin County, while lettered routes operate across the Susquehanna River in the Harrisburg "West Shore" area in Cumberland County.  Many routes operate Monday through Saturday, though some only operate Monday through Friday during rush hours.  None of CAT's fixed routes operate on Sundays; however the shared ride division does provide rides seven days a week. Many routes only operate over a portion of the route for certain runs.

Local routes 
The following routes provide local bus service, with all routes serving Downtown Harrisburg:

Commuter routes 
The following routes provide commuter bus service, operating during weekday peak hours to and from Harrisburg:

Raider Regional Transit 
CAT operates Raider Regional Transit, which provides service to Shippensburg University of Pennsylvania and Shippensburg.

Funding 
CAT has about a 35% farebox recovery ratio.  The remainder of the operational funds to provide service as well as capital funds comes from Cumberland and Dauphin Counties, the City of Harrisburg, and Pennsylvania Department of Transportation.  Additional funding for capital expenditures is received from the Federal Transit Administration.

Connecting services 
Essentially all of CAT's East Shore routes and many of their West Shore routes stop within one block of the Harrisburg Transportation Center, the primary intercity passenger rail and bus hub in the greater Harrisburg area.  Transportation operators who currently provide service at the HTC include Amtrak, Greyhound Lines, Capitol Trailways, and Fullington Trailways.  In addition, CAT's Route 7 (Middletown) stops within one block of the Middletown Amtrak station and the Route 322 (Hershey) shares multiple stops in Hershey with Capitol Trailways' Harrisburg/Reading route.

All of CAT's routes excluding the Route 81 – Shippensburg/Naval Base and Route L – Lemoyne Shuttle routes have shared stops in downtown Harrisburg with the Rabbit Transit York/Harrisburg commuter bus route, the RabbitEXPRESS.  Rabbit Transit is CAT's counterpart public transit agency in York County.

Most of CAT's routes also connect at multiple locations in downtown Harrisburg with rush hour, commuter bus routes operated by R & J Transportation. R & J Transportation runs two Schuylkill County/Harrisburg routes.

In Hershey, the Route 322 connects with selected bus routes within the County of Lebanon Transit Authority or COLT system.  COLT is the transit provider in Lebanon County.  Connecting routes include COLT's Route 8, which connects with the CAT Route 322 at Tanger Outlets Hershey and COLT's Route 18, which shares stops with the Route 322 at various locations within the village of Hershey and at the Penn State Hershey Medical Center.  COLT also has "Twilight Run", evening service on the Route 8 that connects with CAT's Hershey route.

Finally, the Route 7 (Middletown) stops on some of its runs at Harrisburg International Airport, the primary commercial service airport in South Central Pennsylvania.  Most major U.S. passenger airlines, excluding dedicated low-cost carriers, have flights to/from HIA.

Proposed commuter rail services

Capital Red Rose Corridor (Corridor One) 

In late 1999, CAT's board of directors voted unanimously to pursue the vision of bringing commuter rail to the Harrisburg metropolitan area. The project, initially named CorridorOne, will provide regional rail service along existing rail facilities within the lower Susquehanna Valley, linking Lancaster with Harrisburg. Original planning of the corridor would have extended service along a 54-mile stretch between Lancaster, Harrisburg and Carlisle, Cumberland County; however, the Harrisburg to Carlisle segment was dropped from the proposal in 2005.

Project schedule 
 Preliminary engineering and environmental studies phase – completed August 2006
 Final engineering design phase – est. 2009
 Construction phase – complete late 2010 (est.)
 Lancaster to Harrisburg service – operational late 2010 (est.)

Corridor Two 
CAT and the Modern Transit Partnership began discussing a second commuter rail corridor in 2009, designated Corridor Two.  Corridor Two would operate between York, Harrisburg, and Lebanon.  There may be difficulties implementing the Harrisburg-Lebanon segment of CorridorTwo, as this segment would operate on the heavily traveled and fast-growing Norfolk Southern Harrisburg Line, an east–west trunk line in Norfolk Southern's freight rail system.  Norfolk Southern has discussed upgrading and potentially expanding capacity of the Harrisburg-Lebanon segment of their system for freight rail operations as part of their Crescent Corridor initiative between the U.S. Gulf Coast and northern New Jersey.

Park-and-ride locations 
 Carlisle Commons (Routes C, CX, 81N)
 City Island (Routes 2, A, B, C, D, K, M, MA)
 Clarks Ferry (Middle Paxton Township) (Route 23)
 Colonial Park Mall (Lower Paxton Township) ) (Route 12)
 Dillsburgh Bon-Ton (Routes B, 120)
 Dauphin (Route 23)
 Elizabethville Wal-Mart (Route 23)
 Fairview Plaza (New Cumberland) (Route A)
 Harrisburg Mall (Swatara Township) (Routes 8, 13, 19, 20)
 Hershey Intermodal Center (Derry Township) (Route 322)
 Hershey Outlets (Derry Township)(Route 322)
 Linglestown Amelia's Grocery (Lower Paxton Township) (Route 12)
 Linglestown K-Mart (Lower Paxton Township) (Route 12)
 Mechanicsburg K-Mart (Routes C, 81S)
 Mechanicsburg Weis Market (Route MX)
 Newville (Routes 81N, 82S)
 Old Dillsburg Middle School (Route 120)
 Olympic Skating Center (East Pennsboro Township) (Route F)
 Point Mall (South Hanover Township) (Routes 14, 15)
 Shippensburg Wal-Mart (Routes 81N, 82S)
 Winding Hill Rd (Upper Allen Township) (Route 120)

References

External links 

 Capital Area Transit homepage
 CORRIDORone Commuter Rail
 Modern Transit Partnership homepage
 CorridorOne & Connections on Google Maps

Bus transportation in Pennsylvania
Transportation in Harrisburg, Pennsylvania
Municipal authorities in Pennsylvania
Transit agencies in Pennsylvania
Transportation in Dauphin County, Pennsylvania
Transportation in Cumberland County, Pennsylvania
Transportation in York County, Pennsylvania
Government of Dauphin County, Pennsylvania
Government of York County, Pennsylvania
Government of Cumberland County, Pennsylvania